Abraham Jarvis (May 5, 1739 – May 3, 1813) was the second American Episcopal bishop of the Episcopal Diocese of Connecticut and eighth in succession of bishops in the Episcopal Church. He was a high churchman and a loyalist to the crown.

Biography 
Jarvis was born in Norwalk, Connecticut and graduated from Yale College in 1761. He studied under the Rev. Thomas Bradbury Chandler, rector of St. John's Episcopal Church, Elizabeth, N.J. He was ordained deacon on February 5, 1764, and priest on February 19, 1764, by the Church of England. He served as rector of Christ Church, Middletown, Connecticut, from 1764 to 1799.

Jarvis served as a chaplain to imprisoned Loyalist sympathizers during the American Revolution. He presided at a convention in New Haven, Connecticut, of clergy of Connecticut on July 23, 1776, which decided to suspend worship in the colony for fear of the British. He was one of ten Episcopal priests who met in Woodbury, Connecticut, on March 25, 1783, and elected Samuel Seabury as the first bishop of the Episcopal Church, serving as secretary of the meeting. Jarvis was consecrated second bishop of Connecticut on October 18, 1797. Completing his service in Middletown in 1799, he then served in Cheshire until 1803 and finally in New Haven, where he died. His remains are interred under the high altar at Trinity Church on the Green.

Jarvis Hall, the oldest dormitory at Trinity College in Hartford, Connecticut, is named after Abraham Jarvis.

Consecrators 
 The Right Reverend William White (second in succession), first presiding bishop of the Episcopal Church and first bishop of Pennsylvania
 The Right Reverend Samuel Provoost, (third in succession), third presiding bishop of the Episcopal Church and first bishop of New York
 The Right Reverend Edward Bass (seventh in succession), first bishop of Massachusetts

Publications 
 "Sermon on the Death of Bishop Seabury", 1796

See also 
 Succession of Bishops of the Episcopal Church in the United States

Notes and references 

 Historical material by and about Jarvis from Project Canterbury

1739 births
1813 deaths
People from Norwalk, Connecticut
History of Christianity in the United States
18th-century Anglican bishops in the United States
British North American Anglicans
Episcopal Church in Connecticut
Yale College alumni
19th-century Anglican bishops in the United States
Episcopal bishops of Connecticut
18th-century American clergy